Blake Archbold (born 11 July 2001) is an Australian professional footballer who plays as a midfielder for the Newcastle Jets.

On 14 March 2021, Archbold extended his contract with the Newcastle Jets for a further season.

References

External links

Living people
2001 births
Australian soccer players
Association football forwards
Newcastle Jets FC players
National Premier Leagues players
A-League Men players